is a Japanese composer and arranger, best known for his work on the soundtracks for Octopath Traveler and various music video game series developed by Bemani. He is currently a freelance composer, and has since produced soundtracks for both video games and anime.

Biography
Nishiki was born on July 10, 1985 in Kanagawa Prefecture. He started taking piano lessons when he was a child, but became interested in music when he became a fan of the Japanese band Spitz. After which, he bought some sheet music for their songs and began to write his own compositions on the piano. After graduating from Tokyo College of Music, he began to work as a music composer for Konami, and worked on titles such as Quiz Magic Academy series, and arranged the national anthems for Pro Evolution Soccer 2011, which are also used in the further installments in the series. He had also produced several tracks for various music video game series such as Reflec Beat, Pop'n Music, and Jubeat under the alias Vivian.

He left Konami to pursue his career as a freelancer, and began to expand his works for various non-gaming projects such as anime and puppet shows. His first major project was the soundtrack for the video game Octopath Traveler; the soundtrack received positive reception from critics and fans, and was nominated for "Best Score/Music" at The Game Awards 2018. It has spawned many arrangement albums and has also been performed live in concerts. He would later work on the anime Azur Lane, and Princess Connect! Re:Dive.

He has collaborated with Kohei Tanaka as a synthesizer programmer for several of his works, including Gravity Rush 2 and One Piece.

Works

Video games

Anime

Other projects

References

External links
 

Discography at VGMdb

1985 births
Anime composers
Freelance musicians
Japanese composers
Japanese male composers
Japanese music arrangers
Japanese television composers
Living people
Male television composers
Musicians from Kanagawa Prefecture
People from Kanagawa Prefecture
Progressive rock musicians
Symphonic rock musicians
Video game composers
Tokyo College of Music alumni